An afterword is a literary device that is often found at the end of a piece of literature. It generally covers the story of how the book came into being, or of how the idea for the book was developed.

An afterword may be written by someone other than the author of the book to provide enriching comment, such as discussing the work's historical or cultural context (especially if the work is being reissued many years after its original publication).

See also
 Conclusion
 Epilogue
 Foreword
 Postface
 Postscript

References

Book design
Literature